The Living Corpse is a 1968 Soviet drama film directed by Vladimir Vengerov.

Plot 
Fyodor Protasov as a result of unwillingness to live dishonestly sinks to the bottom of society.

Cast 
 Aleksey Batalov as Fyodor Protasov (Fedya)
 Alla Demidova as Yelizaveta Andreyevna Protasova (Liza)
 Oleg Basilashvili as Viktor Mikhajlovich Karenin
 Lidiya Shtykan as Anna Pavlovna
 Sofiya Pilyavskaya as Anna Dmitrievna Karenina
 Yevgeny Kuznetsov as Sergey Abrezkov
 Svetlana Toma as Masha
 Vsevolod Kuznetsov as Afremov

References

External links 
 

1968 films
1960s Russian-language films
Soviet drama films
1968 drama films